Events in the year 1910 in China.

Incumbents
Emperor: Xuantong Emperor (1st year)
Regent: Empress Dowager Longyu

Events

February 
 February 14 -- Establishment of the Vicariate Apostolic of Central Chi-Li.

April 
 April 16 -- Wang Jingwei and Luo Shixun were arrested separately. They were arrested for conspiracy to assassinate and kill Prince Chun in Beijing.

June 
 June 5 -- The open of Nanyang industrial exposition.

July 
 July 7 -- Establishment of Chin Woo Athletic Association.
 July 27 -- On July 27, Qing Dynasty Government approved the loans from the foreign banks. (Shanghai rubber stock market crisis)

October 
 October 3 -- first National Assembly of China convenes, urges Prince Chun to increase constitutional reforms.
 October 18 -- At Nanking, Establishment of the Chinese Olympic Committee. (Chinese National Games)

November 
 November 13 -- 1910 Penang conference.
 November 29 -- The closing of Nanyang industrial exposition.

References

 
1910s in China
Years of the 20th century in China